The National Youth Leadership Council (NYLC) is a national nonprofit organization located in Saint Paul, Minnesota, that promotes service-learning in schools and communities across the United States. Founded in 1983 by Dr. James Kielsmeier, NYLC is the host of the annual National Service-Learning Conference. The organization is a proponent of service-learning and national service in the United States.

History 
Founded in 1983, to "create a more just, sustainable, and peaceful world with young people, their schools, and their communities through service-learning". The National Youth Leadership Council began hosting the National Service-Learning Conference in 1989. In 1993 the organization became the main training and technical assistance for the Corporation for National Service focused on service learning.

Programs 

NYLC publishes an annual research publication, Growing to Greatness, that seeks to document the scope, scale, and impacts of service-learning. An edition has been published each year since 2004. Each edition features a series of topical research articles from leading scholars in the field as well as qualitative profiles of several U.S. states and territories and, increasingly, state-by-state data on service-learning and positive youth contributions.

In 2008, NYLC released the K-12 Service-Learning Standards for Quality Practice that detail the eight standards of quality service-learning, with three to five accompanying indicators for each standard. The standards are the result of a national review process that began with research from the field and vetted the previously-published Essential Elements of Service-Learning through a series of reactor panels to arrive at the final document.

See also
Youth service
Service-learning
National Service-Learning Conference
Youth voice

References

External links

Youth organizations based in Minnesota
Educational organizations based in the United States